Kiss 105 was a dance music radio station based in Leeds, West Yorkshire. It was part of a new breed of regional radio stations as opposed to independent local radio.

History
Its parent company, Faze FM won the Yorkshire and Humberside Regional Radio licence. Faze already operated Kiss 102 in Manchester. EMAP who owned London's Kiss 100 gave Faze permission to license the name.

Later in 1997, both stations were sold to Chrysalis Radio who then rebranded the stations as Galaxy 105 as the brand licence required them to relinquish the name.

Technical
A total of four transmitters were used to cover the whole of Yorkshire. The East Riding of Yorkshire is served by 105.8, Sheffield by 105.6, Bradford by 105.6 and a general Yorkshire transmitter on 105.1 FM. The studios were based at Joseph's Well, Hanover Walk, Park Lane in Leeds, West Yorkshire and are still used for Capital Yorkshire. Some of the programmes were shared with the Manchester station.

DJs/presenters

 BamBam
 Tony Fisher
 Rob Tissera
 Jo-Jo (Now at Capital Yorkshire - part of Capital Yorkshire Drivetime alongside Adam O’Neill, weekdays 4-7pm  )
 Alex Pepper
 Graeme Park
 Jez Willis
 David Dunne

 Andi Durrant
 Anthony Collins
 James Blessing
 Sara Fellows (News)
 Lisa Moskaluk (News)
 John-Paul Glover (aka JP)
 Jay Smith
 Nemone Metaxas
 Ambient Alliance aka Ste p & DjayH (Drum And Bass Show)

References

External links
Marketing Mix Profile: Gordon McNamee Managing director of KISS
Nemone's Biography

Dance radio stations
Defunct radio stations in the United Kingdom
Radio stations established in 1997
Radio stations in Yorkshire